The Ihosy River is a river in Fianarantsoa Province in central Madagascar. It runs down from the hills of Bekisopa, through the town of Ihosy (at ), which provides the name of the river.

Other passage points are Ambodiala and Ionadria. It empties in the Zomandao River

References

Fianarantsoa Province
Rivers of Madagascar
Rivers of Ihorombe